Francis Stanley Arnot Hewitt (13 March 1936 in Belfast, Northern Ireland – 14 August 2001 in Ireland) was an Irish cricketer. A right-handed batsman and right-arm fast-medium and off spin bowler, he played three times for the Ireland cricket team between 1955 and 1966, including one first-class match against Scotland.

Playing career

Hewitt made his debut for Ireland in 1955, playing against the MCC at Lord's. He took 2/59 in the MCC's first innings, his best bowling figures for Ireland. He did not play for Ireland again until July 1966, when he returned to the side for a game against Middlesex, before his only first-class match against Scotland. He scored 36, his highest score, in that match but did not play again for Ireland.

Statistics

In all matches for Ireland, he scored 58 runs at an average of 9.67 and took four wickets at an average of 51.75.

References

1936 births
2001 deaths
Irish cricketers
Cricketers from Belfast
Cricketers from Northern Ireland